Until 1 January 2007 Nørre-Rangstrup, was a municipality (Danish, kommune) in the former South Jutland County on the Jutland peninsula in south Denmark. The municipality covered an area of 302 km2, and had a total population of 9,502 (2005).  Its last mayor was Ole Østvig Nissen, a member of the Venstre (Liberal Party) political party. The main town and the site of its municipal council was the town of Toftlund.

 Agerskov,  Parish
 Arrild Parish
 Bevtoft,  Parish
 Branderup Parish
 Tirslund,  Parish
 Toftlund Parish

Nørre-Rangstrup municipality ceased to exist due to Kommunalreformen ("The Municipality Reform" of 2007).  It was merged with existing Bredebro, Højer, Løgumkloster, Skærbæk, and Tønder municipalities to form the new Tønder municipality.  This created a municipality with an area of 1,352 km2 and a total population of 42,645 (2005).

Notable people 
 Frode Sørensen (born 1946 at Toftlund) a Danish politician, was Tax Minister 2000-2001 and a Member of Parliament (Folketinget) 1998-2007

References 
 Municipal statistics: NetBorger Kommunefakta, delivered from KMD aka Kommunedata (Municipal Data)
 Municipal mergers and neighbors: Eniro new municipalities map

External links 
 The new Tønder municipality's official website (Danish only)

Former municipalities of Denmark
Tønder Municipality